Juan Manuel Rozas (1936 – January 14, 1986) was a Spanish writer. After her died the Juan Manuel Rozas Prize was set up in his memory and it was won by the Spanish poet Ada Salas in 1988.

Works
The Count of Villamediana. Bibliography and contribution to the study of texts. Madrid, CSIC, 1964 (bibliographic Papers, 11)
Songs of Mendes Brito. Unpublished works of Count Villamediana. Madrid, CSIC, 1965
Academy held in the city of Ciudad Real in 1678. Ciudad Real, Manchegos Studies Institute, 1965
The language and literature at the CSIC. Madrid, CSIC (in collaboration with A. Quilis)
Bartholomew Jimenez Paton. Spelling Epitome of Latin and Castilian. Institutions of Spanish grammar. Study and editing. Madrid, CSIC, 1965, "Hispanic Classics" (in collaboration with A. Quilis)
Breton de los Herreros. Work dispersed. Logroño. Riojanos Studies Institute, 1965 (in collaboration with JM Díez Taboada)
The poetic generation of 1927. Study, anthology and documentation. Madrid, Alcala, 1966 (in collaboration with Joaquin Gonzalez Muela)
The poetic generation of 1927. Second ed., Greatly enlarged and modified. Madrid, Alcala, 1974 «limina" 3. ª ed. greatly enlarged, Madrid, Isthmus, 1986
Villamediana: CC sonnets. Introduction and texts. Barcelona, Mars, 1967
Villamediana: Works (1629). Study and editing. Madrid, Castalia, 1969, 2. ª ed., Madrid, Castalia, 1980
Azorin. Castilla. Edition, preface and notes. Barcelona, Labor, 1973. "Modern Hispanic Texts', 21
The generation of 27 from within. Madrid, Alcala, 1974 «limina", 3). 2. ª ed. greatly enlarged, Madrid, Isthmus, 1986, "Bella Bellatrix»
Meaning and doctrine of "New Art" of Lope. Madrid, SGEL, 1976 (collection "Themes")
Life and work of Villamediana. (Forthcoming in Ed Ariel)
About Marino and Spain. Madrid, National Editor, 1978
The Golden Age Theater in times of Lope de Vega. Madrid, UNED, 1976
History of Literature, I. Madrid, UNED, 1976, 2 vols. (Directed and written eight chapters)
The 27 and generation. Santander, The Mouse Island, 1978
History of Literature, II. Madrid, UNED, 1978, 2 vols. (Directed and written five chapters)
Poetry (1930-1931). Facsimile Edition and Introduction, 2 vols., Vaduz, Topos Verlag, 1979
Intra and literature. Salamanca, University International Courses, 1980
The poetic group of 27. Madrid, Chisel, 1980, 2 vols. (In collaboration with G. Torres Nebrera)
Lope de Vega and Felipe IV in senectute cycle. Opening address by 1982-83. Cáceres, Extremadura University, 1982
Three Secrets (loudly) from the literature 27. Cáceres, Publications of the Department of Literature, 1983
Periods of Spanish literary literature (exemplified with bibliographers Extremadura). Cáceres, Publications of the Department of Literature, 1983
Gonzalo de Berceo, Miracles of Our Lady. Juan Manuel Rozas Ed. Barcelona, Plaza y Janes, "Classic", 1986. Reprinted in Madrid, Libertarian
Studies on Lope de Vega. Edited by Jesus Cañas Murillo. Madrid, Chair, 1990
Human and divine rhymes of Mr. Tome of Burguillos. Juan Manuel Rozas Editing and Jesus Cañas Murillo. Madrid, Castalia, "Castalia Classics", in press
Consolation and their gods. The Mouse Island, Santander, 1984
Anonymous Guadalupe Villarreal and Yuste, double Songbook. Juan Manuel Rozas Ed. Cáceres, 1985 (Palinodia, n. # 1, annexed to gauge)
Ostinato. Badajoz, Provincial Government, 1986 (posthumous)
Speech manual. Cáceres, Editions Norba 10004, col. 'Tiles' 3

References

Spanish philologists
Spanish literary critics
Spanish male writers
1936 births
1986 deaths
20th-century philologists